Lade Vale is a locality in the Upper Lachlan Shire, New South Wales, Australia. It lies on the south side of the Hume Highway about 30 km to the east of Yass.

References

Upper Lachlan Shire
Localities in New South Wales
Southern Tablelands